The Ellis River is a  river in Oxford County in western Maine.  It is a tributary of the Androscoggin River.

The river begins at the outlet of Ellis Pond in the northwest corner of Roxbury and flows southwest via a meandering course into Andover, passing the village of East Andover before turning more to the southeast near South Andover.  The river enters the corporate limits of Rumford and joins the Androscoggin at the village of Rumford Point.

From South Andover to the river's mouth, the Ellis River is followed by Maine State Route 5. U.S. Route 2 crosses the river just above its outlet to the Androscoggin.

References

Tributaries of the Kennebec River
Rivers of Maine
Rivers of Oxford County, Maine